Type 320 Lindau-class minehunters was a class of German coastal minehunters built as part of the first FRG naval program. The ships were made from non-metallic components and built by Burmester Bremen. None of these ships now remain in service with the German Navy. Several went into service with the Estonian and Lithuanian Navy, as well as the Latvian Naval Forces. Flensburg and Weilheim became museum pieces.

Starting in 1970, 11 vessels of this class were upgraded to Type 331 s. Beginning 1979, the six remaining vessels of this class were upgraded to Type 351 Ulm class. They were replaced by the Type 352 s.

All six Type 351s were sold to the South African Navy in 2001. The remaining five ships were sold by the South African Navy to a private owner in 2009 for conversion into pleasure vessels.

Ship list

See also

External links

 Lindau class — Battleships-Cruisers.co.uk